Of Love and Other Demons is a novel by Colombian writer Gabriel García Márquez published in 1994.

In the prologue, García Márquez claims the novel is the fictional representation of a legend the author was told by his grandmother when he was a boy: of a 12-year-old marquise with long flowing hair who had died of rabies, and was believed to be a 'miracle-worker'. In this frame-story, it was only after an excavation of tombs that García Márquez is witness to the grave of a similar young girl with long red hair still attached to the skull, that he was inspired to write Of Love and Other Demons.

In 2008, the opera Love and Other Demons, by Hungarian composer Péter Eötvös was premiered at the Glyndebourne Festival.

Plot
Sierva Maria de Todos Los Angeles is the twelve-year-old daughter of the Marquis and his wife Bernarda. Her hair has never been cut, and was promised to the saints when she was born with the umbilical cord around her neck. She was raised by the slaves, fluent in multiple African languages, and familiar with the customs. In the beginning of the book she is bit by a rabid dog. Even though she shows no signs of rabies, she is subject to multiple "healing" methods, which can be considered torture. She is sent to the convent of Santa Clara to receive an exorcism, which many people have died from. She receives attention from a priest, Father Cayetano, who is kind to her and initially believes she does not need to be exorcised. Father Cayetano falls in love with Sierva Maria and declares her his love; he soon begins visiting Sierva in her cell in secret, climbing up from the sewer (that in future is fixed). They eat, sleep, and recite poetry together, even though it does not appear that they are sexually involved. Later Father Cayetano is sent away to a leper hospital where he hopes to get the disease but never does. Sierva Maria in the meantime is last summoned to be exorcised and she eventually dies 'of love' wondering where Father Cayetano is and after having her hair cut. After her death, her hair magically grows back on her skull.

References

Sources

1994 novels
20th-century Colombian novels
Alfred A. Knopf books
Colombian magic realism novels
Novels about exorcism
Novels adapted into operas
Novels by Gabriel García Márquez